Waleed, also spelt as Walid, Oualid, or Velid, is an Arabic-language masculine given name meaning newborn child.

Given name

Waleed
Waleed Ali, Kuwaiti footballer
Waleed Aly, Egyptian-origin Australian journalist
Waleed bin Ibrahim al-Ibrahim, Saudi businessman
Al-Waleed bin Talal al-Saud, Saudi royal and businessman
Waleed al-Husseini, Palestinian ex-Muslim activist

Walid
Al-Walid I, sixth Umayyad caliph
Walid Abbas, Emirati footballer
Walid Atta, Saudi-born Ethiopian footballer
Walid bin Attash, Yemeni suspected terrorist in American custody at Guantánamo Bay
Walid Belguerfi, Algerian footballer
Walid Daouk, Lebanese businessman and politician
Walid Hassan, Iraqi comedian
Walid al-Jahdali, Saudi footballer
Walid Jumblatt, Lebanese politician
Walid Khalidi, Palestinian historian 
Walid al-Kubaisi, Iraqi-origin Norwegian writer
Walid Muallem, Syrian politician and diplomat
Walid ibn al-Mughira, Mecca-based Quraysh tribal chief in pre-Islamic Arabia
Walid Regragui (born 1975), Moroccan footballer and manager
Walid Riachy, Lebanese actor and model
Walid Shoebat, Palestinian-origin American ex-Muslim activist
Walid Toufic, Lebanese singer and actor

Oualid
Oualid Mokhtari, Moroccan-born German footballer

Places 
Al-Waleed, an Iraqi town along the Iraq–Syria border
Bani Walid, a town in Libya
Valladolid, a city in Spain
Valladolid, a city in Mexico

Ships
, a Lebanese cargo ship from 1979–1985 (originally German-built fishing trawler)

See also
Al-Walid (disambiguation)
Walid (armoured personnel carrier), an Egyptian APC used in the Arab–Israeli conflict

References

Arabic masculine given names